Bangaru Babu may refer to:
 Bangaru Babu (2009 film), a film starring Jagapati Babu
 Bangaru Babu (1973 film), a film starring Akkineni Nageswara Rao